Benedict Ngalama Ole-Nangoro (born 17 July 1956) is a Tanzanian CCM politician and Member of Parliament for Kiteto constituency since 2008. He served as the Deputy Minister of Livestock Development and Fisheries from 2010 to 2014.

References

1956 births
Living people
Chama Cha Mapinduzi MPs
Tanzanian MPs 2005–2010
Tanzanian MPs 2010–2015
Alumni of the University of Sussex